Kubler or Kübler may refer to:

People with the surname Kubler 
 Françoise Kubler (born 1958), French operatic soprano
 George Kubler (1912–1996), American art historian
 Ida Ivanka Kubler (born 1978), visual artist
 Jason Kubler (born 1993), Australian tennis player
 Tad Kubler, American guitarist

People with the surname Kübler 
 Andreas Kübler (born 1963), West German-German slalom canoeist
 Elisabeth Kübler-Ross (1926–2004), Swiss-born psychiatrist and the author of the groundbreaking book On Death and Dying
 Felix Kübler (born 1969), German economist
 Ferdinand Kübler (1919–2016), retired Swiss cyclist
 Jannis Kübler (born 1999), German footballer
 Jürgen Kübler, West German slalom canoeist
 Klaus Kübler (born 1959), German triple jumper
 Ludwig Kübler (1889–1947), German General of the Mountain Troops during World War II
 Lukas Kübler (born 1992), German footballer
 Maria Susanna Kübler (1814–1873), Swiss writer
 Stella Kübler (1922–1994), Jewish woman who collaborated with the Nazis
 Ursula Kübler (1928–2010), Swiss ballerina and actress

Other uses 
 Kübler Absinthe, a Swiss anise-flavored spirit
 Kübler-Ross model, the five stages of grief

See also 
 Kuebler
 Kuffner (surname)